Le Procès-Verbal (English title: The Interrogation) is the debut novel of French Nobel laureate writer J. M. G. Le Clézio, about a troubled man named Adam Pollo who "struggles to contextualize what he sees" and "to negotiate often disturbing ideas while simultaneously navigating through, for him, life’s absurdity and emptiness".

In 2022, the novel was included on the "Big Jubilee Read" list of 70 books by Commonwealth authors, selected to celebrate the Platinum Jubilee of Elizabeth II.

Subject
The novel is about Adam Pollo, a loner man who had been marginalized from society. His long hair and his beard make him appear a beggar. Pollo is a former student who suffers from amnesia. He does not know whether he was perhaps a deserter from the army or if he has escaped from a psychiatric ward. Le Clézio wrote:
 He breaks into an empty seaside villa. He visits the town at rare intervals and as briefly as his scant purchases (of cigarettes, biscuits, or even beer) require. Soon, lack of human contact affects him like a drug and he experiences other modes of being: through a dog's or rat’s eyes, states of heightened consciousness which build up into a terrifying world of glaring hallucinatory experience. Then Adam addresses a small crowd in the town. His unnerving rhetoric ends in his arrest and commitment to an asylum. And there the interrogation begins.

Award(s)
 Written when Le Clézio was 23, this novel was shortlisted for the prix Goncourt.
 Received the prix Renaudot in 1963.
 Unsuccessful in the Prix Formentor.

Publication history
Seven editions published between 1988 and 2004 in 4 languages and held by 766 libraries worldwide.

See also 
Le Monde 100 Books of the Century

References

1963 debut novels
1963 French novels
Éditions Gallimard books
Novels by J. M. G. Le Clézio
Works by J. M. G. Le Clézio